Petra Feucht (born 22 March 1965), born Petra Keppeler, is a former professional tennis player from Germany.

Biography

Tennis career
Born in Augsburg, Keppeler played professionally in the 1980s.

Keppeler featured in a total of nine Federation Cup ties for West Germany, which included a semi-final win over Switzerland in 1983. 

As a qualifier she made the fourth round of the 1984 French Open, before her run was ended by third seed Hana Mandlíková, in a match which went to three sets. 

She was a semi-finalist at Bregenz in 1985. It was at Bregenz that she won her only WTA title, partnering with Austrian Petra Huber to win the doubles competition. 

At the age of 22 she retired from tennis to pursue other interests and now works as a tax consultant in Augsburg-Firnhaberau.

Personal life
She is now known as Petra Feucht, through her marriage to Gregor, a general practitioner. The couple have two children, a son and daughter. Their son, Michael, plays collegiate tennis for the Lamar Cardinals.

WTA Tour finals

Doubles (1-1)

ITF finals

Doubles (1-0)

References

External links
 
 
 

1965 births
Living people
German female tennis players
West German female tennis players
Sportspeople from Augsburg
Tennis people from Bavaria